Sheykh Mohammadlu (also Romanized as Sheykh Moḩammadlū; also known as Sheykh Moḩammad) is a village in Arshaq-e Gharbi Rural District, Moradlu District, Meshgin Shahr County, Ardabil Province, Iran. At the 2006 census, its population was 238, in 58 families.

References 

Tageo

Towns and villages in Meshgin Shahr County